Mid-Carolina Regional Airport  (formerly Rowan County Airport) is a public airport located three miles (5 km) southwest of the central business district (CBD) of Salisbury, a city in Rowan County, North Carolina, USA.

Although most U.S. airports use the same three-letter location identifier for the FAA and IATA, Mid-Carolina Regional Airport is assigned RUQ by the FAA and SRW by the IATA. The airport's ICAO identifier is KRUQ.

Services
There are rental cars available for transportation. Aircraft maintenance, painting and interiors, avionics installation and repair is also available. The airport also offers a flight school, a pilot's lounge and office space rental.

References

External links 
  at North Carolina DOT airport guide
 

Airports in North Carolina
Transportation in Rowan County, North Carolina
Buildings and structures in Rowan County, North Carolina